Argyle Street (formerly Argyle Buildings) is a historic street in the centre of Bath, England located between Pulteney Bridge and Laura Place.

History
As part of the Bathwick Estate, Argyle Street was designed by Thomas Baldwin for Sir William Pulteney. Construction of the street was completed around 1789. The buildings were intended to serve as residential townhouses like those immediately adjacent in Laura Place. However, over several decades shopfronts were added to form an extension to the shopping parade on Pulteney Bridge. As a result the street now has a fine selection of shopfronts with designs from several different architectural periods. Particularly noteworthy are the late Georgian shopfronts to numbers 8, 9, and 16, and Victorian shopfronts to numbers 6, 7, and 12.

The Argyle Congregational Chapel is located on the north side of the street between numbers 6 and 7. It is used by a United Reformed Church congregation.

See also

 Grade II* listed buildings in Bath and North East Somerset

References

Grade II* listed buildings in Bath, Somerset
Grade II listed buildings in Bath, Somerset
Streets in Bath, Somerset